The 2001–02 B Group was the 47th season of the Bulgarian B Football Group, the second tier of the Bulgarian football league system. A total of 13 teams contested the league.

Team changes
The following teams had changed division after the 2000–01 season.

To B Group

From B Group

Teams

Stadiums and locations

Personnel

Managerial changes

League table

Top scorers

References

2001-02
Bul
2